Vi gör det igen was released on 21 April 2010, and is a studio album by Scotts.

The album consists of a recording of the song "In a Moment Like This", Denmark's Eurovision Song Contest 2010 entry, here performed by Scotts as a duet with Erica Sjöström from the Drifters, and a recording of The Playtones song "Sofie" from the Dansbandskampen 2009 finals. The album also consists of a recording of the 1966 Sven-Ingvars song, "Kristina från Vilhelmina".

The song "Jag ångrar ingenting" charted at Svensktoppen for one week on 25 July 2010, before getting knocked out of chart.

Track listing

Personnel 
Henrik Strömberg - vocals, guitar
Claes Linder - keyboards, choir
Roberto Mårdstam - bass, choir
Per-Erik "Lillen" Tagesson - drums
Production and arrangement: Roberto Mårdstam, Claes Linder
Song production/Choir arrangement: Henrik Sethsson
Recorded in Studio Scotts, Lidköping, Sweden
Mixed by: Plec i Panicroom
Engineer assistant: Ermin Harmidović
Executive producer: Bert Karlsson
The song "Jennie" produced and arranged by Henrik Sethsson och Pontus Assarsson and mixed by Jörgen Ringqvist
Photography: Karin Törnblom
Graphic form: R & R Reproduktion.se

Charts

References 

2010 albums
Scotts (band) albums